Major General Sir James Howden MacBrien  (30 June 1878 – 5 March 1938) was a Canadian soldier and Chief of the General Staff, the head of the Canadian Militia (renamed the Canadian Army in 1940) from 1920 until 1927.

Military career
Educated in Port Perry, MacBrien initially joined the Canadian Militia with the 34th Ontario Regiment but then transferred to the North-West Mounted Police and, during the Second Boer War, to the South African Constabulary. Returning to Canada he was commissioned into the Royal Canadian Dragoons.

He also served in World War I as a general staff officer and then, from 1916, as commanding officer of 12th Infantry Brigade.

After the war he was appointed Chief of the General Staff.

He also served as the eighth Commissioner of the Royal Canadian Mounted Police, from August 1, 1931 to March 5, 1938. MacBrien died in Toronto.

Family
In 1907 he married Nellie Louise Ross and in 1928 he married Emily Emely Hartridge.

References

External links
 

1878 births
1938 deaths
Canadian generals of World War I
Canadian anti-communists
Canadian Expeditionary Force officers
Commanders of the Order of St John
Canadian Companions of the Distinguished Service Order
Canadian Companions of the Order of St Michael and St George
Canadian Knights Commander of the Order of the Bath
People from Scugog
Canadian military personnel from Ontario
Royal Canadian Mounted Police commissioners
Royal Canadian Dragoons officers
Canadian military personnel of the Second Boer War

Canadian Militia officers